Dovecote, also called doocot in Scottish English is a building for pigeons or doves.

Dovecote may also refer to:

 Dovecote Records, a New York-based record label
 Dovecote Novices' Hurdle, a British Grade 2 National Hunt hurdle race
 Dovecot (software), an open source IMAP and POP3 server for Linux/UNIX-like systems
 The Dovecote, an Association Football stadium in Shepshed, Leicestershire, home to Shepshed Dynamo F.C. and formerly home to Shepshed Albion F.C. (known as Shepshed Charterhouse from 1975 to 1992)
 Dovecotes, Wolverhampton, a housing estate in Pendeford, Wolverhampton

See also
 Flutter in the Dovecote, a 1986 novel by Scottish writer Bruce Marshall
 Dovecot (disambiguation)